Marc Mallett (b. Belfast) is a Northern Irish broadcaster and journalist.  He is a newsreader and reporter at UTV, and the Northern Ireland correspondent for ITV News.

Broadcasting career
Mallett began his broadcasting career on the hospital radio station at the Royal Victoria Hospital, Belfast.  He went on to work for Belfast CityBeat for ten years, initially as a volunteer and eventually becoming News Editor at the station.

During his time at UTV, Mallett contributed to Late and Live and The Seven Thirty Show.  He was previously a continuity announcer  and also presented in-vision weather forecasts for the station.

In 2007, Mallett was the recipient of the Radio News Broadcaster of the Year at the CIPR Press and Broadcast Awards.  He received a finalist's certificate in the category of Best News Anchor/Reporter (Local) at the New York Festivals Radio Broadcasting Awards, where Belfast Tonight also received a Bronze World Medal in the category of Best News Magazine.

Personal life
Mallett attended Campbell College, Belfast, and later studied at Belfast Metropolitan College.

Mallett has conducted charity work with Cinemagic and the Alzheimer's Society.  He lives in Belfast.

References

External links

Living people
Journalists from Northern Ireland
Radio personalities from Northern Ireland
Television presenters from Northern Ireland
LGBT people from Northern Ireland
UTV (TV channel)
Year of birth missing (living people)
LGBT broadcasters from Northern Ireland